In mathematics, the Morse–Palais lemma is a result in the calculus of variations and theory of Hilbert spaces. Roughly speaking, it states that a smooth enough function near a critical point can be expressed as a quadratic form after a suitable change of coordinates.

The Morse–Palais lemma was originally proved in the finite-dimensional case by the American mathematician Marston Morse, using the Gram–Schmidt orthogonalization process. This result plays a crucial role in Morse theory.  The generalization to Hilbert spaces is due to Richard Palais and Stephen Smale.

Statement of the lemma 

Corollary 

Let  be  such that  is a non-degenerate critical point. Then there exists a -with--inverse diffeomorphism  and an orthogonal decomposition

such that, if one writes

then

See also

References 

 

Calculus of variations
Hilbert space
Lemmas in analysis